The 2015 IPC Athletics World Championships  were a Paralympic track and field meet organized by the World Para Athletics subcommittee of the International Paralympic Committee. The event was the 7th edition of what is now known as the World Para Athletics Championships, held from 21 to 31 October 2015 at the Suheim Bin Hamad Stadium in Doha, Qatar. It featured 119 men's events and 91 women's events. The Marathon events which are traditionally part of the world championships were separated from the competition and instead held on 26 April as part of the London Marathon.

Venues
In January 2013 the IPC announced that Doha would hold the 2015 athletics world championships. In March 2014 the Suhaim Bin Hamad Stadium, a 15,000-seat venue with an eight-lane track, was confirmed as the host of the event which would take place between 19 and 28 November. However the championships were moved forward by a month to 22 October to avoid construction work around the city. In October 2014 it was decided that the Marathon events would be held separately. The marathon was staged on 26 April at the 2015 London Marathon.

Coverage
The International Paralympic Committee provided live video coverage of over 70 hours of events on its website, as well as live coverage, videos of events and interviews on its ParalympicSportTV channel on YouTube.

In the United Kingdom, Channel 4's sister channel More4 aired live coverage daily throughout the Championship.

Coverage in Germany was streamed live on www.deutsche-paralympische-mannschaft.de with further availability on the German Olympic Sports Confederation (DOSB) sports channel.

Format
The qualification period for the championships lasted from 1 January 2014 to 31 August 2015 with a maximum of three athletes from each nation qualifying for each individual event. Each athlete was required to meet at least the B qualification standards in one IPC approved event. Athletes were required to enter at least one individual event to be able to participate in relays. However, in events where classes are combined each nation may send a maximum of five qualifying athletes.

The marathon events were held separately, taking place on 26 April, the reason given was that the London Marathon would give a better schedule for the athletes. The qualifying period for the marathon events were run between 1 January 2014 to 9 February 2015. All athletes were required to meet the minimum qualifying time to be able to participate having achieved the time at an IPC approved event. Up to six athletes from one country were allowed to compete in each class for the marathon. A maximum of two guide runners per an athlete were allowed for the T11 and 12 classes.

Schedule

The marathon events for both women and men took part outside the main championship in Doha and were contested as part of the 2015 London Marathon. Unlike the previous Championship in Lyon, no events were contested across disability classifications, whereby results would be giving a points weighting to determine a winning athlete. Many events are open to athletes with lower classification numbers, who are deemed to have a greater impairment, such as the men's discus F56, which can also be contested by F54 and F55 classification athletes.

 Records Brokens

Medal table 
The medal table at the end of the competition saw China at its head in both total medal count and gold medals won. The host nation Qatar failed to achieve a medal.

Participating nations
Below is the list of countries who agreed to participate in the Championships and the requested number of athlete places for each.

 (2)
 (15)
 (5) 
 (21)
 (48)
 (6)
 (10)
 (6)     
 (8)
 (5)
 (1)
 (40)
 (9)
 (4)
 (31)
 (2)
 (4)
 (79)
 (4)
 (8)
 (14)
 (6)
 (1)
 (14)
 (7)
 (14)
 (3)
 (1)
 (10)
 (17)
 (31)
 (47)
 (22)
 (4)
 (7)
 (2)
 (15)
 (7)
 (19)
 (4)
 (9)
 (13)
 (7)
 (56)
 (5)
 (8)
 (11)
 (7)
 (5)
 (8)
 (1)
 (5)
 (6)
 (25)
 (1)
 (2)
 (3)
 (9)
 (5)
 (8)
 (18)
 (8)
 (1)
 (7)
 (2)
 (3)
 (2)
 (2)
 (1)
 (38)
 (23)
 (8)
 (76)
 (2)
 (5)
 (2)
 (5)
 (4)
 (2)
 (22)
 (27)
 (6)
 (9)
 (9)
 (1)
 (19)
 (2)
 (9)
 (24)
 (31)
 (18)
 (76)
 (11)
 (5)
 (4)
 (1)

References

External links
 Official web-site

 
World Para Athletics Championships
IPC Athletics World Championships
IPC Athletics World Championships
International athletics competitions hosted by Qatar
IPC Athletics World Championships